Bradshaw's Ferry was a ferry at the crossing point on the Colorado River, of the Bradshaw Trail at Olive City and later at Mineral City and Ehrenburg, between what was then San Diego County, California and Arizona County, New Mexico Territory.  The ferry connected the Bradshaw Trail to the road to the gold placers of La Paz, the first big strike of the Colorado River Gold Rush. From 1863, the La Paz - Wikenburg Road connected the Bradshaw Trail to the new mining boom town settlements in the interior of Arizona Territory.

History
Bradshaw's Ferry was established by William D. Bradshaw soon after he had discovered the route of the Bradshaw Trail when he made a partnership with William Warringer of La Paz to establish a ferry on Providence Point, across the river from Olive City and the road to nearby La Paz.  Williams returned to Los Angeles and published an announcement in the Los Angeles Star of the new road between San Gorgonio Pass he had established and of the ferry to the goldfields at the end of the trail.	

On November 7, 1864, the Territorial Legislature permitted the ferry, now in Yuma County, Arizona Territory, to charge $4.00 for a wagon and 2 horses, $3.00 for a carriage and 1 horse, $1.00 for saddle horse, $0.50 for a man afoot, $0.50 a head for cattle and horses, $0.25 a head for sheep. It was authorized to operate ferries at any and every point between Mineral City and five miles above La Paz for up to twenty years.  At first the ferry operated at Olive City then in 1864 at Mineral City, and lastly at Ehrenburg from 1866 when it replaced the two other settlements.  William Bradshaw himself left operations of the ferry to his brother Issac and died in 1864, officially a suicide, but possibly a murder.  Issac Bradshaw sold out his interest in 1867.

References

External links
  Official Map Of The Territory Of Arizona, With All The Recent Explorations. Compiled by Richard Gird C.E. Commissioner. Approved By John N. Goodwin, Governor. In Accordance With An Act Of The Legislature, Approved Oct. 23d. 1864. We hereby certify that this is the Official Map of the Territory of Arizona, and approve the same. Prescott October 12th 1865. (with signed seal dated 1863). Published By A. Gensoul, Pacific Map Depot. No. 511 Montgomery St. San Francisco. Lith. Britton & Co. San Francisco.  Accessed from www.davidrumsey.com, December 1, 2014. Shows location of Bradshaw Ferry, Olive City, Mineral City and other landings, settlements and the mining districts along the Colorado River and the interior of the territory in 1865.
  Topographical Sketch showing the Outward and Inward Route of a Party, while examining as to the practicability of a Diversion of the Colorado River for Purposes of Irrigation, Lithograph by Eric Bergland, 1875. From, Wheeler, G.M., Topographical Atlas Projected To Illustrate United States Geographical Surveys West Of The 100th Meridian Of Longitude Prosecuted In Accordance With Acts Of Congress Under The Authority Of The Honorable The Secretary Of War, And The Direction Of Brig. Genl. A.A. Humphreys, Chief Of Engineers, U.S. Army. Embracing Results Of the Different Expeditions Under The Command Of 1st Lieut. Geo. M. Wheeler, Corps Of Engineers. Julius Bien, lith., G. Thompson, Washington, 1876 from davidrumsey.com accessed December 3, 2014.] From davidrumsey.com, accessed April 20, 2015.  Shows the Colorado River above Ehrenburg, Arizona to Stones Ferry at the mouth of the Virgin River; in Southern California, parts of Nevada, and Arizona.  Includes the roads and railroads of the time, including the detailed route of the Bradshaw Trail.  From a Wheeler Annual Report.  Gift to the David Rumsey collection by Mark Sappington.

Ferries of Arizona
Ferries of California
History of La Paz County, Arizona
History of Riverside County, California
Steamboat transport on the Colorado River
Historic sites in Arizona
1862 establishments in New Mexico Territory
Populated places established in 1862
Bradshaw Trail